Bowman-Biltmore Hotels was a hotel chain created by the hotel magnate John McEntee Bowman.

The name evokes the Vanderbilt family's Biltmore Estate, whose buildings and the gardens within are privately owned historical landmarks and tourist attractions in Asheville, North Carolina, United States. The name has since been adopted by other unrelated hotels. For a time, the Bowman-Biltmore Hotels Corporation was a publicly traded company.

Historic locations

Planned hotels
A Detroit Biltmore was planned for the site of the Hotel Tuller on Detroit's Grand Circus Park. The Tuller was to have been demolished in 1929 and replaced by a towering 35-story, 1500 room hotel with an attached 14-story garage and 18-story office building. The plans were abandoned when the stock market crashed that year.

Unassociated hotels

Florida 
The Palm Beach Biltmore was not connected to the Bowman Biltmore group. It was built in 1926 as the Alba, renamed The Ambassador in 1929, and sold to Henry L. Doherty in 1933. Doherty, who had bought the Miami Biltmore two years earlier, renamed the hotel the Palm Beach Biltmore. It was later owned by Hilton Hotels, closed in the 1970s, and was converted to condos from 1979 to 1981.

Hawaii

The Waikiki Biltmore was a resort hotel on Waikiki, Honolulu, Hawaii, that operated from 1955 to 1974. The Biltmore was the first high-rise hotel on Waikiki but operated for only 19 years and was demolished and replaced with the Hyatt Regency. 

Permits were filed for an eight-story hotel in March 1953, with groundbreaking taking place in November of that year. Joseph Greenbach constructed the building, which opened on February 19, 1955. Construction cost $4 million. The hotel was built on the site of Canlis Charcoal Broiler, the first restaurant opened by Peter Canlis, which opened in 1947. The opening was met with great fanfare, including a flight from California chartered by Greenbach.

Nevada 
The Tahoe Biltmore Lodge & Casino, a hotel-casino in Crystal Bay, Nevada, very near the California border among the communities known as North Shore Tahoe. Opened In 1947. It will become a Waldorf Astoria hotel scheduled to open in 2027.

Oklahoma
The Oklahoma Biltmore in Oklahoma City was an unassociated hotel that once stood downtown, at 228 West Grand Avenue. It was built in 1932 during the Great Depression by the city's prominent civic leaders at the time, headed by Charles F. Colcord. Designed by architects Hawk & Parr, the Biltmore had 619 rooms and was 24 stories high, making it the state's second tallest building only to the Ramsey Tower built in 1931, when it was completed. In 1936 alone, the Biltmore was headquarters for 104 conventions and saw 114,171 guests. After a $3 million renovation in the mid-1960s the Biltmore was renamed the Sheraton-Oklahoma Hotel. By 1973, the hotel had left Sheraton, and the Oklahoma City Urban Renewal Authority agreed with the owners that the Biltmore had outlived its useful life. In contrast, architect I. M. Pei had envisioned keeping the hotel, and his sketches and models all showed the tower overlooking the surrounding "Tivoli Gardens". The hotel was one of the largest demolitions in the country at the time it was blown up on October 16, 1977 by a team of demolition specialists to make way for the "Myriad Gardens". Hundreds of low-yield explosives were planted throughout the building so that it would collapse and fall inward into an acceptable area only slightly larger than the hotel's foundation.

References

External links
Movies filmed at the Millennium Biltmore Hotel from MoviePlaces.tv